The Syrian civil war is an ongoing multi-sided civil war in Syria fought between the Syrian Arab Republic led by Syrian president Bashar al-Assad (supported by domestic and foreign allies) and various domestic and foreign forces that oppose both the Syrian government and each other, in varying combinations.

Unrest in Syria began on 15 March 2011 as part of the wider 2011 Arab Spring protests out of discontent with the Syrian government, eventually escalating to an armed conflict after protests calling for Assad's removal were violently suppressed. The war is currently being fought by several factions. The Syrian Armed Forces and its domestic and international allies represent the Syrian Arab Republic and the Assad regime. Opposed to it is the Syrian Interim Government, a big-tent alliance of pro-democratic, nationalist opposition groups (whose defense forces consist of the Syrian National Army and the Free Syrian Army). Another faction is the Syrian Salvation Government, a coalition of Sunni Islamist rebel groups headed by Tahrir al-Sham. Independent of all of them is the de facto autonomous territory of Rojava, whose armed wing is the mixed Kurdish-Arab Syrian Democratic Forces (SDF). Other competing factions include Salafi Jihadist organisations such as the Al-Qaeda-affiliated Al-Nusra Front and the Islamic State (ISIS/ISIL). The peak of the war was during 2012–2017; violence in the country has since diminished, but the situation remains a crisis.

A number of foreign countries, such as Iran, Russia, Turkey, and the United States, have either directly involved themselves in the conflict or provided support to one or another faction. Iran, Russia, and Hezbollah support the Syrian Arab Republic and the Syrian Armed Forces militarily, with Russia conducting airstrikes and ground operations since September 2015. The U.S.-led international coalition, established in 2014 with the declared purpose of countering ISIL, has conducted airstrikes primarily against ISIL as well as some against government and pro-government targets. They have also deployed special forces and artillery units to engage ISIL on the ground. Since 2015, the U.S. has supported the Autonomous Administration of North and East Syria and its armed wing, the Syrian Democratic Forces (SDF), materially, financially, and logistically. Turkish forces have fought the SDF, ISIL, and the Syrian government since 2016, but have also actively supported the Syrian opposition and currently occupy large swaths of northwestern Syria while engaging in significant ground combat. Between 2011 and 2017, fighting from the Syrian civil war spilled over into Lebanon as opponents and supporters of the Syrian government traveled to Lebanon to fight and attack each other on Lebanese soil, with ISIL and al-Nusra also engaging the Lebanese Army. Furthermore, while officially neutral, Israel has exchanged border fire and carried out repeated strikes against Hezbollah and Iranian forces, whose presence in western Syria it views as a threat.

The war has resulted in an estimated 470,000–610,000 deaths, making the Syrian civil war the second deadliest conflict of the 21st century after the Second Congo War. International organizations have accused virtually all sides involved, the Assad regime, ISIL, opposition groups, Iran, Russia, Turkey, and the U.S.-led coalition of severe human rights violations and massacres. The conflict has caused a major refugee crisis, with millions fleeing mainly to neighboring countries Turkey, Lebanon and Jordan. Over the course of the war, a number of peace initiatives have been launched, including the March 2017 Geneva peace talks on Syria led by the United Nations, but fighting has continued.

As of 2023, active fighting in the conflict between the Syrian government and rebel groups had mostly subsided, but there were occasional flareups in Northwestern Syria.   In early 2023, reports indicated that the forces of ISIS in Syria had mostly been defeated, with only a few cells remaining in various remote locations.   

On June 5, 2022, the leader of the Syrian Democratic Forces (SDF), Mazloum Abdi, said that forces of the Kurdish government in the Autonomous Administration of North and East Syria (AANES) were willing to work with Syrian government forces to defend against Turkey, saying “Damascus should use its air defense systems against Turkish planes." Abdi said that Kurdish groups would be able to cooperate with the Syrian government, and still retain their autonomy. The joint discussions were a result of the negotiation processes that had begun in October 2019.

Background

Assad government 

The non-religious Ba'ath Syrian Regional Branch government came to power through a coup d'état in 1963. For several years, Syria went through additional coups and changes in leadership, until in March 1971, General Hafez al-Assad, an Alawite, declared himself President. It marked the beginning of the domination of personality cults centred around the Assad dynasty that pervaded all aspects of Syrian daily life and was accompanied by a systematic suppression of civil and political freedoms; becoming the central feature of state propaganda. Authority in Ba'athist Syria is monopolised by three power-centres: Alawite clans, Ba'ath party and the armed forces; glued together by unwavering allegiance towards the Assad dynasty.

The Syrian Regional Branch remained the dominant political authority in what had been a one-party state until the first multi-party election to the People's Council of Syria was held in 2012. On 31 January 1973, Hafez al-Assad implemented a new constitution; leading to a national crisis. The 1973 Constitution entrusted Arab Socialist Baath party with the distinctive role as the "leader of the state and society"; empowering it to mobilise the civilians for party programmes, issue decrees to ascertain their loyalty and supervise all legal trade unions. Ba'athist ideology was imposed upon children as compulsory part of school curriculum and Syrian Armed Forces were tightly controlled to the Party. The constitution removed Islam from being recognised as the state religion and stripped existing provisions such as the president of Syria being required to be a Muslim. These measures caused widespread furore amongst the public; leading to fierce demonstrations in Hama, Homs and Aleppo organized by the Muslim Brotherhood and the ulama. Assad regime violently crushed the Islamic revolts that occurred during 1976–1982, waged by revolutionaries from the Syrian Muslim Brotherhood.

The Ba'ath party carefully constructed Assad as the guiding father figure of the party and modern Syrian nation; advocating the continuation of Assad dynastic rule of Syria. As part of the publicity efforts to brand the nation and Assad dynasty as inseparable; slogans such as "Assad or we burn the country", "Assad or to hell with the country" and "Hafez Assad, forever" became an integral part of the state and party discourse during the 1980s. Eventually the party organisation itself became a rubberstamp and the power structures became deeply dependent on sectarian affiliation to the Assad family and the central role of armed forces needed to crack down on dissent in the society. Critics of the regime have pointed out that deployment of violence is at the crux of Ba'athist Syria and describe it as "a dictatorship with genocidal tendencies". Upon Hafez al-Assad's death in 2000, his son Bashar al-Assad succeeded him as the President of Syria.

Bashar's wife Asma, a Sunni Muslim born and educated in Britain, was initially hailed in the Western press a "rose in the desert". The couple once raised hopes amongst Syrian intellectuals and outside Western observers as wanting to implement economic and political reforms. However, Bashar failed to deliver on promised reforms; instead crushing the civil society groups, political reformists and democratic activists that emerged during the Damascus spring in the 2000s. Bashar Al-Assad claims that no 'moderate opposition' to his government exists, and that all opposition forces are jihadists focused on destroying the current secular leadership; his view was that terrorist groups operating in Syria are 'linked to the agendas of foreign countries'.

Demographics 

The total population in July 2018 was estimated at 19,454,263 people; ethnic groups – approximately Arab 50%, Alawite 15%, Kurd 10%, Levantine 10%, other 15% (includes Druze, Ismaili, Imami, Assyrian, Turkmen, Armenian); religions – Muslim 87% (official; includes Sunni 74% and Alawi, Ismaili, and Shia 13%), Christian 10% (mainly of Eastern Christian churches – may be smaller as a result of Christians fleeing the country), Druze 3% and Jewish (few remaining in Damascus and Aleppo).

Socioeconomic background 
Socioeconomic inequality increased significantly after free market policies were initiated by Hafez al-Assad in his later years, and it accelerated after Bashar al-Assad came to power. With an emphasis on the service sector, these policies benefited a minority of the nation's population, mostly people who had connections with the government, and members of the Sunni merchant class of Damascus and Aleppo. In 2010, Syria's nominal GDP per capita was only $2,834, comparable to Sub-Saharan African countries such as Nigeria and far lower than its neighbors such as Lebanon, with an annual growth rate of 3.39%, below most other developing countries.

The country also faced particularly high youth unemployment rates. At the start of the war, discontent against the government was strongest in Syria's poor areas, predominantly among conservative Sunnis. These included cities with high poverty rates, such as Daraa and Homs, and the poorer districts of large cities.

Drought 
This coincided with the most intense drought ever recorded in Syria, which lasted from 2006 to 2011 and resulted in widespread crop failure, an increase in food prices and a mass migration of farming families to urban centers. This migration strained infrastructure already burdened by the influx of some 1.5 million refugees from the Iraq War. The drought has been linked to anthropogenic global warming. Subsequent analysis, however, has challenged the narrative of the drought as a major contributor to the start of the war. Adequate water supply continues to be an issue in the ongoing civil war and it is frequently the target of military action.

Human rights 

The human rights situation in Syria has long been the subject of harsh critique from global organizations. The rights of free expression, association and assembly were strictly controlled in Syria even before the uprising. The country was under emergency rule from 1963 until 2011 and public gatherings of more than five people were banned. Security forces had sweeping powers of arrest and detention. Despite hopes for democratic change with the 2000 Damascus Spring, Bashar al-Assad was widely reported as having failed to implement any improvements. In 2010, he imposed a controversial national ban on female Islamic dresscodes such as faceveils across universities and expelled over a thousand female tutors and school teachers as part of the ban. A Human Rights Watch report issued just before the beginning of the 2011 uprising stated that Assad had failed to substantially improve the state of human rights since taking power.

Timeline 

Protests, civil uprising, and defections (March–July 2011)

Initial armed insurgency (July 2011 – April 2012)

Kofi Annan ceasefire attempt (April–May 2012)

Next phase of the war starts: escalation (2012–2013)

 
Rise of the Islamist groups (January–September 2014)

US intervention (September 2014 – September 2015)

Russian intervention (September 2015 – March 2016), including first partial ceasefire

Aleppo recaptured; Russian/Iranian/Turkish-backed ceasefire (December 2016 – April 2017)

Syrian-American conflict; de-escalation Zones (April–June 2017)

ISIL siege of Deir ez-Zor broken; CIA program halted; Russian forces permanent (July–December 2017)

Army advance in Hama province and Ghouta; Turkish intervention in Afrin (January–March 2018)

Douma chemical attack; U.S.-led missile strikes; Southern Syria offensive (April–August 2018)

Idlib demilitarization; Trump announces US withdrawal; Iraq strikes ISIL targets (September–December 2018)

ISIL attacks continue; US states conditions of withdrawal; Fifth inter-rebel conflict (January–May 2019)

Demilitarization agreement falls apart; 2019 Northwestern Syria offensive; Northern Syria Buffer Zone established (May–October 2019)

U.S. forces withdraw from buffer zone; Turkish offensive into north-eastern Syria (October 2019)

Northwestern offensive; Baylun airstrikes; Operation Spring Shield; Daraa clashes; Afrin bombing (late 2019; 2020)

New economic crisis and stalemate conflict (June 2020–present)

Belligerents

Syrian factions
There are numerous factions, both foreign and domestic, involved in the Syrian civil war. These can be divided into four main groups. First, Ba'athist Syria led by Bashar al-Assad and backed by his Russian and Iranian allies. Second, the Syrian opposition consisting of two alternative governments: i) the Syrian Interim Government, a big-tent coalition of democratic, Syrian nationalist and Islamic political groups whose defense forces consist of the Syrian National Army and Free Syrian Army. ii) the Syrian Salvation Government, a Sunni Islamist coalition led by Hay'at Tahrir al-Sham. Third, the Kurdish-dominated Rojava administration and its military-wing Syrian Democratic Forces supported by the United States. Fourth, the Global Jihadist camp consisting of Al-Qaeda affiliate Guardians of Religion Organisation and its rival Islamic State of Iraq and the Levant. The Syrian government, the opposition and the SDF have all received support, militarily and diplomatically, from foreign countries, leading the conflict to often be described as a proxy war.

Foreign involvement 

The major parties supporting the Syrian Government are Iran, Russia and Lebanese militia Hezbollah. Syrian rebel groups received political, logistic and military support from the United States, Turkey, Saudi Arabia, Qatar, Britain, France, Israel, and the Netherlands. Under the aegis of operation Timber Sycamore and other clandestine activities, CIA operatives and U.S. special operations troops have trained and armed nearly 10,000 rebel fighters at a cost of $1 billion a year since 2012. Iraq had also been involved in supporting the Syrian government, but mostly against ISIL.

Spillover 

In June 2014, members of the Islamic State of Iraq and the Levant (ISIL) crossed the border from Syria into northern Iraq, and took control of large swaths of Iraqi territory as the Iraqi Army abandoned its positions. Fighting between rebels and government forces also spilled over into Lebanon on several occasions. There were repeated incidents of sectarian violence in the North Governorate of Lebanon between supporters and opponents of the Syrian government, as well as armed clashes between Sunnis and Alawites in Tripoli.

Starting on 5 June 2014, ISIL seized swathes of territory in Iraq. As of 2014, the Syrian Arab Air Force used airstrikes targeted against ISIL in Raqqa and al-Hasakah in coordination with the Iraqi government.

Weaponry and warfare

Chemical weapons 

Sarin, mustard agent and chlorine gas have been used during the conflict. Numerous casualties led to an international reaction, especially the 2013 Ghouta attacks. A UN fact-finding mission was requested to investigate reported chemical weapons attacks. In four cases UN inspectors confirmed the use of sarin gas. In August 2016, a confidential report by the United Nations and the OPCW explicitly blamed the Syrian military of Bashar al-Assad for dropping chemical weapons (chlorine bombs) on the towns of Talmenes in April 2014 and Sarmin in March 2015 and ISIS for using sulfur mustard on the town of Marea in August 2015.

The United States and the European Union have said the Syrian government has conducted several chemical attacks. Following the 2013 Ghouta attacks and international pressure, the destruction of Syria's chemical weapons began. In 2015 the UN mission disclosed previously undeclared traces of sarin compounds in a "military research site". After the April 2017 Khan Shaykhun chemical attack, the United States launched its first intentional attack against Syrian government forces. Investigation conducted by Dr. Tobias Schneider and Theresa Lutkefend of the GPPi research institute documented 336 confirmed attacks involving chemical weapons in Syria between 23 December 2012 and 18 January 2019. The study attributed 98% of the total chemical attacks to the Assad regime. Almost 90% of the attacks occurred after Ghouta chemical attack in August 2013.

In April 2020, the UN Security Council briefing was held on the findings of a global chemical weapons watchdog, Organisation for the Prohibition of Chemical Weapons (OPCW), which found that the Syrian air force used sarin and chlorine for multiple attacks, in 2017. The close allies of Syria, Russia and European countries debated on the issue, where the OPCW findings were dismissed by Moscow while many Western European countries called for accountability for the government's war-crimes. The UN Deputy ambassador from Britain, Jonathan Allen stated that report by OPCW's Investigation Identification Team (IIT) claimed that the Syrian regime is responsible for using chemical weapons in the war on at least four occasions. The information was also noted in two UN-mandated investigations.

In April 2021, Syria was suspended from OPCW through the public vote of member states, for not co-operating with the IIT and violating the Chemical Weapons Convention. Findings of another OPCW investigation report published in July 2021 concluded that the Syrian regime had engaged in confirmed chemical attacks at least 17 times, out of the 77 reported incidents of chemical weapons usage attributed to Assadist forces.

Cluster bombs 
Syria is not a party to the Convention on Cluster Munitions and does not recognize the ban on the use of cluster bombs. The Syrian Army is reported to have begun using cluster bombs in September 2012. Steve Goose, director of the Arms Division at Human Rights Watch said "Syria is expanding its relentless use of cluster munitions, a banned weapon, and civilians are paying the price with their lives and limbs", "The initial toll is only the beginning because cluster munitions often leave unexploded bomblets that kill and maim long afterward".

Thermobaric weapons 
Russian thermobaric weapons, also known as "fuel-air bombs", were used by the government side during the war. On 2 December 2015, The National Interest reported that Russia was deploying the TOS-1 Buratino multiple rocket launch system to Syria, which is "designed to launch massive thermobaric charges against infantry in confined spaces such as urban areas". One Buratino thermobaric rocket launcher "can obliterate a roughly  area with a single salvo". Since 2012, rebels have said that the Syrian Air Force (government forces) is using thermobaric weapons against residential areas occupied by the rebel fighters, such as during the Battle of Aleppo and also in Kafr Batna. A panel of United Nations human rights investigators reported that the Syrian government used thermobaric bombs against the strategic town of Qusayr in March 2013. In August 2013, the BBC reported on the use of napalm-like incendiary bombs on a school in northern Syria.

Anti-tank missiles 

Several types of anti-tank missiles are in use in Syria. Russia has sent 9M133 Kornet, third-generation anti-tank guided missiles to the Syrian Government whose forces have used them extensively against armour and other ground targets to fight Jihadists and rebels. U.S.-made BGM-71 TOW missiles are one of the primary weapons of rebel groups and have been primarily provided by the United States and Saudi Arabia. The U.S. has also supplied many Eastern European sourced 9K111 Fagot launchers and warheads to Syrian rebel groups under its Timber Sycamore program.

Ballistic missiles 

In June 2017, Iran attacked ISIL targets in the Deir ez-Zor area in eastern Syria with Zolfaghar ballistic missiles fired from western Iran, in the first use of mid-range missiles by Iran in 30 years. According to Jane's Defence Weekly, the missiles travelled 650–700 kilometres.

War crimes
In 2022, a German court sentenced Anwar Raslan, 58, a high-ranking official of  President Bashar Al-Assad's regime to life imprisonment after he sought asylum in Germany and was arrested in 2019. He was charged with being complicit to the murder of at least 27 people coupled with the sexual assault and torture of at least another 4,000 people between 29 April 2011, and 7 September 2012. Raslan was a mid-level officer in Branch 251 and oversaw the torture of detainees. His trial was one of an unprecedented nature because Germany took on a trial of crimes committed in the Syrian war and the human rights lawyers took this on under the principle of  "universal jurisdiction". Universal Jurisdiction is a concept in German law that allows for serious crimes to be tried in Germany even if they did not happen in the country. His co-defendant Eyad al-Gharib, 44, a low-level officer in Branch 251 was also sentenced to 4 years and 6 months in prison on 24 February 2021. Eyad's duties included the transport of detainees to  location where they would be tortured for days on end. It was his knowledge of the fact that torture was happening there that landed him the sentence.

Sectarianism 

The successive governments of Hafez and Bashar al-Assad have been closely associated with the country's minority Alawite religious group, an offshoot of Shia, whereas the majority of the population, and most of the opposition, is Sunni. Alawites started to be threatened and attacked by dominantly Sunni rebel fighting groups like al-Nusra Front and the FSA since December 2012 (see Sectarianism and minorities in the Syrian Civil War#Alawites).

A third of 250,000 Alawite men of military age have been killed fighting in the Syrian civil war. In May 2013, SOHR stated that out of 94,000 killed during the war, at least 41,000 were Alawites.

Many Syrian Christians reported that they had fled after they were targeted by the anti-government rebels. (See: Sectarianism and minorities in the Syrian Civil War#Christians.)

The Druze community in Syria has been divided by the civil war, and has experienced persecution by Islamist rebels, ISIL, the government and the government's Hezbollah allies. (See: Sectarianism and minorities in the Syrian Civil War#Druze.)

As militias and non-Syrian Shia—motivated by pro-Shia sentiment rather than loyalty to the Assad government—have taken over fighting the opposition from the weakened Syrian Army, fighting has taken on a more sectarian nature. One opposition leader has said that the Shia militias often "try to occupy and control the religious symbols in the Sunni community to achieve not just a territorial victory but a sectarian one as well"—reportedly occupying mosques and replacing Sunni icons with pictures of Shia leaders. According to the Syrian Network for Human Rights, human rights abuses have been committed by the militias including "a series of sectarian massacres between March 2011 and January 2014 that left 962 civilians dead".

Kurdish autonomy in Rojava 

The Autonomous Administration of North and East Syria (AANES), also known as Rojava, is a de facto autonomous region in northeastern Syria. The region does not claim to pursue full independence but autonomy within a federal and democratic Syria. Rojava consists of self-governing sub-regions in the areas of Afrin, Jazira, Euphrates, Raqqa, Tabqa, Manbij and Deir Ez-Zor. The region gained its de facto autonomy in 2012 in the context of the ongoing Rojava conflict, in which its official military force, the Syrian Democratic Forces (SDF), has taken part.

While entertaining some foreign relations, the region is not officially recognized as autonomous by the government of Syria or any state except for the Catalan Parliament. The AANES has widespread support for its universal democratic, sustainable, autonomous pluralist, equal, and feminist policies in dialogues with other parties and organizations. Northeastern Syria is polyethnic and home to sizeable ethnic Kurdish, Arab and Assyrian populations, with smaller communities of ethnic Turkmen, Armenians, Circassians, and Yazidis.

The supporters of the region's administration state that it is an officially secular polity with direct democratic ambitions based on an anarchistic, feminist, and libertarian socialist ideology promoting decentralization, gender equality, environmental sustainability, social ecology and pluralistic tolerance for religious, cultural and political diversity, and that these values are mirrored in its constitution, society, and politics, stating it to be a model for a federalized Syria as a whole, rather than outright independence. The region's administration has also been accused by some partisan and non-partisan sources of authoritarianism, support of the Syrian government, Kurdification, and displacement. However, despite this the AANES has been the most democratic system in Syria, with direct open elections, universal equality, respecting human rights within the region, as well as defense of minority and religious rights within Syria.

In March 2015, the Syrian Information Minister announced that his government considered recognizing Kurdish autonomy "within the law and constitution". While the region's administration was not invited to the Geneva III peace talks on Syria, or any of the earlier talks, Russia in particular called for the region's inclusion and did to some degree carry the region's positions into the talks, as documented in Russia's May 2016 draft for a new constitution for Syria.

An analysis released in June 2017 described the region's "relationship with the government fraught but functional" and a "semi-cooperative dynamic". In late September 2017, Syria's Foreign Minister said that Damascus would consider granting Kurds more autonomy in the region once ISIL was defeated.

On 13 October 2019, the SDF announced that it had reached an agreement with the Syrian Army which allowed the latter to enter the SDF-held cities of Manbij and Kobani in order to dissuade a Turkish attack on those cities as part of the cross-border offensive by Turkish and Turkish-backed Syrian rebels. The Syrian Army also deployed in the north of Syria together with the SDF along the Syrian-Turkish border and entered into several SDF-held cities such as Ayn Issa and Tell Tamer. Following the creation of the Second Northern Syria Buffer Zone the SDF stated that it was ready to work cooperatively with the Syrian Army if  a political settlement between the Syrian government and the SDF was achieved.

According to information gathered in December 2021, Iraqi authorities have returned 100 Iraqi fighters from the ISIL (ISIS) group who were being held by Kurdish forces in northeast Syria.

As of 2022, the main military threat and conflict faced by Rojava's official defense force, the Syrian Democratic Forces (SDF), are firstly, an ongoing conflict with ISIS; and secondly, ongoing concerns of possible invasion of the northeast regions of Syria by Turkish forces, in order to strike Kurdish groups in general, and Rojava in particular. An official report by the Rojava government noted Turkey-backed militias as the main threat to the region of Rojava and its government.

In May 2022 Turkish and opposition Syrian officials said that Turkey's Armed Forces and the Syrian National Army are planning a new operation against the SDF, composed mostly of the YPG/YPJ. The new operation is set to resume efforts to create 30-kilometer (18.6-mile) wide "safe zones" along Turkey's border with Syria, President Erdoğan said in a statement. The operation aims at the Tal Rifaat and Manbij regions west of the Euphrates and other areas further east. Meanwhile, Ankara is in talks with Moscow over the operation. President Erdoğan reiterated his determination for the operation on 8 August 2022.

Humanitarian impact

Refugees 

, 3.8 million have been made refugees. , 1 in 3 of Syrian refugees (about 667,000 people) sought safety in Lebanon (normally 4.8 million population). Others have fled to Jordan, Turkey, and Iraq. Turkey has accepted 1,700,000 (2015) Syrian refugees, half of whom are spread around cities and a dozen camps placed under the direct authority of the Turkish Government. Satellite images confirmed that the first Syrian camps appeared in Turkey in July 2011, shortly after the towns of Deraa, Homs, and Hama were besieged. In September 2014, the UN stated that the number of Syrian refugees had exceeded 3 million. According to the Jerusalem Center for Public Affairs, Sunnis are leaving for Lebanon and undermining Hezbollah's status. The Syrian refugee crisis has caused the "Jordan is Palestine" threat to be diminished due to the onslaught of new refugees in Jordan. Greek Catholic Patriarch Gregorios III Laham says more than 450,000 Syrian Christians have been displaced by the conflict. , the European Union has reported that there are 13.5 million refugees in need of assistance in the country. Australia is being appealed to rescue more than 60 women and children stuck in Syria's Al-Hawl camp ahead of a potential Turkish invasion.

A major statement from NGO ACT Alliance found that millions of Syrian refugees remain displaced in countries around Syria. This includes around 1.5 million refugees in Lebanon. Also the report found that refugees in camps in north-eastern Syria have tripled this year.

Numerous refugees remain in local refugee camps. Conditions there are reported to be severe, especially with winter approaching.

4,000 people are housed at the Washokani Camp. No organizations are assisting them other than the Kurdish Red Cross. Numerous camp residents have called for assistance from international groups.

Refugees in Northeast Syria report they have received no help from international aid organizations.

On 30 December 2019, over 50 Syrian refugees, including 27 children, were welcomed in Ireland, where they started afresh in their new temporary homes at the Mosney Accommodation Centre in Co Meath. The migrant refugees were pre-interviewed by Irish officials under the Irish Refugee Protection Programme (IRPP).

As of  2022 there are over 5.6 million refugees. Over 3.7 million of those (about 65%) are in Turkey. These figures have seen a lot of blame lain on refugees across the political spectrum in the country. They are being blamed for the worsening economic crisis. Measures have been put in place to "drive them out" including raised fees on utilities such water and services such as marriage licences. There has been an increase on attacks targeting Syrian refugees in the country.

Return of refugees 

Another aspect of the post-war years will be how to repatriate the millions of refugees. The Syrian government has put forward a law commonly known as "law 10", which could strip refugees of property, such as damaged real estate. There are also fears among some refugees that if they return to claim this property they will face negative consequences, such as forced conscription or prison. The Syrian government has been criticized for using this law to reward those who have supported the government. However, the government said this statement was false and has expressed that it wants the return of refugees from Lebanon. In December 2018, it was also reported that the Syrian government has started to seize property under an anti-terrorism law, which is affecting government opponents negatively, with many losing their property. Some people's pensions have also been cancelled.

Erdogan said that Turkey expects to resettle about 1 million refugees in the "buffer zone" that it controls. Erdogan claimed that Turkey had spent billions on approximately five million refugees now being housed in Turkey; and called for more funding from wealthier nations and from the EU. This plan raised concerns amongst Kurds about displacement of existing communities and groups in that area.

Internally displaced refugees 

The violence in Syria caused millions to flee their homes. As of March 2015, Al-Jazeera estimate 10.9 million Syrians, or almost half the population, have been displaced. Violence erupted due to the ongoing crisis in northwest Syria has forced 6,500 children to flee every day over the last week of January 2020. The recorded count of displaced children in the area has reached more than 300,000 since December 2019.

As of 2022, there are 6.2 million internally displaced persons in Syria according to United Nations High Commissioner for Refugees. 2.5 million of those are children. 2017 alone saw the displacement of at least 1.8 million people, many of them being displaced for the second and third time.

Hundreds of boys are being held hostage by ISIS. As of 25 January 2022, The New York Times stated that the fight over a prison in northeastern Syria has brought attention to the plight of thousands of foreign children who were brought to Syria by their parents to join the Islamic State caliphate and have been detained for three years in camps and prisons in the region, abandoned by their home countries.

An estimated 40,000 foreigners, including children, travelled to Syria to fight for the caliphate or work for it. Thousands of them had brought their small children with them. There were also other children born there. When ISIS lost control of the last piece of territory in Syria, Baghuz, three years ago, surviving women and young children were detained in camps, while suspected militants and boys, some as young as 10, were imprisoned.

Furthermore, when the boys in the camps reach the age of adolescence, they are usually transferred to Hasaka's Sinaa prison, where they are packed into overcrowded cells with no access to sunlight.  According to prison guards in the area, there is insufficient food and medical attention. When the boys reach the age of 18, they are sent to the regular prison population, where wounded ISIS members are placed three to a bed.

Casualties 

On 2 January 2013, the United Nations stated that 60,000 had been killed since the civil war began, with UN High Commissioner for Human Rights Navi Pillay saying "The number of casualties is much higher than we expected, and is truly shocking". Four months later, the UN's updated figure for the death toll had reached 80,000. On 13 June 2013, the UN released an updated figure of people killed since fighting began, the figure being exactly 92,901, for up to the end of April 2013. Navi Pillay, UN high commissioner for human rights, stated that: "This is most likely a minimum casualty figure". The real toll was guessed to be over 100,000. Some areas of the country have been affected disproportionately by the war; by some estimates, as many as a third of all deaths have occurred in the city of Homs.

One problem has been determining the number of "armed combatants" who have died, due to some sources counting rebel fighters who were not government defectors as civilians. At least half of those confirmed killed have been estimated to be combatants from both sides, including 52,290 government fighters and 29,080 rebels, with an additional 50,000 unconfirmed combatant deaths. In addition, UNICEF reported that over 500 children had been killed by early February 2012, and another 400 children have been reportedly arrested and tortured in Syrian prisons; both of these reports have been contested by the Syrian government. Additionally, over 600 detainees and political prisoners are known to have died under torture. In mid-October 2012, the opposition activist group SOHR reported the number of children killed in the conflict had risen to 2,300, and in March 2013, opposition sources stated that over 5,000 children had been killed. In January 2014, a report was released detailing the systematic killing of more than 11,000 detainees of the Syrian government.

On 20 August 2014, a new U.N. study concluded that at least 191,369 people have died in the Syrian conflict. The UN thereafter stopped collecting statistics, but a study by the Syrian Centre for Policy Research released in February 2016 estimated the death toll to be 470,000, with 1.9m wounded (reaching a total of 11.5% of the entire population either wounded or killed).
A report by the pro-opposition SNHR in 2018 mentioned 82000 victims that had been forcibly disappeared by the Syrian government, added to 14.000 confirmed deaths due to torture. According to various war monitors, Syrian Armed Forces and pro-Assad forces has been responsible for over 90% of the total civilian casualties in the civil war.

On 15 April 2017, a convoy of buses carrying evacuees from the besieged Shia towns of al-Fu'ah and Kafriya, which were surrounded by the Army of Conquest, was attacked by a suicide bomber west of Aleppo, killing more than 126 people, including at least 80 children. On 1 January 2020, at least eight civilians, including four children, were killed in a rocket attack on a school in Idlib by Syrian government forces, the Syrian Human Rights Observatory (SOHR) said.

In January 2020, UNICEF warned that children were bearing the brunt of escalating violence in northwestern Syria. More than 500 children were wounded or killed during the first three quarters of 2019, and over 65 children fell victim to the war in December alone.

Over 380,000 people were killed since the war in Syria started nine years ago, war monitor Syrian Observatory for Human Rights said on 4 January 2020. The death toll comprises civilians, government soldiers, militia members and foreign troops.

In an airstrike by Russian forces loyal to the Syrian government, at least five civilians were killed, out of which four belonged to the same family. The Syrian Observatory for Human Rights claimed that the death toll included three children following the attack in the Idlib region on 18 January 2020.

On 30 January 2020, Russian air strikes on a hospital and a bakery killed over 10 civilians in Syria's Idlib region. Moscow immediately rejected the allegation.

On 23 June 2020, Israeli raids killed seven fighters, including two Syrian in a central province. State media cited a military official as saying the attack targeted posts in rural areas of Hama province.

In just 4 days after the turn of the year 2022, two children were killed and 5 others injured in northwest Syria. In 2021 alone, over 70% of violent attacks against children have been recorded in the region 

On 14 January 2022, one person was killed by a car bomb and several others were wounded in the city of Azaz in northwest Syria, three people were wounded at a marketplace in a suspected suicide bombing in the town of al Bab and another suicide bomb went off in the city of Afrin at a roundabout

Human rights violations 

United Nations and human rights organizations have asserted that human rights violations have been committed by both the government and the rebel forces, with the "vast majority of the abuses having been committed by the Syrian government". Numerous human rights abuses, Political repression, war crimes and crimes against humanity perpetrated by the Assad regime throughout the course of the conflict has led to international condemnation and widespread calls to convict Bashar al-Assad in the International Criminal Court (ICC).

According to three international lawyers, Syrian government officials could face war crimes charges in the light of a huge cache of evidence smuggled out of the country showing the "systematic killing" of about 11,000 detainees. Most of the victims were young men and many corpses were emaciated, bloodstained and bore signs of torture. Some had no eyes; others showed signs of strangulation or electrocution. Experts said this evidence was more detailed and on a far larger scale than anything else that had emerged from the then 34-month crisis.

The UN also reported in 2014 that "siege warfare is employed in a context of egregious human rights and international humanitarian law violations. The warring parties do not fear being held accountable for their acts". Armed forces of both sides of the conflict blocked access of humanitarian convoys, confiscated food, cut off water supplies and targeted farmers working their fields. The report pointed to four places besieged by the government forces: Muadamiyah, Daraya, Yarmouk camp and Old City of Homs, as well as two areas under siege of rebel groups: Aleppo and Hama. In Yarmouk Camp 20,000 residents faced death by starvation due to blockade by the Syrian government forces and fighting between the army and Jabhat al-Nusra, which prevents food distribution by UNRWA. In July 2015, the UN removed Yarmouk from its list of besieged areas in Syria, despite not having been able deliver aid there for four months, and declined to say why it had done so. After intense fighting in April/May 2018, Syrian government forces finally took the camp, its population now reduced to 100–200.

ISIS forces have been criticized by the UN of using public executions and killing of captives, amputations, and lashings in a campaign to instill fear. "Forces of the Islamic State of Iraq and al-Sham have committed torture, murder, acts tantamount to enforced disappearance and forced displacement as part of attacks on the civilian population in Aleppo and Raqqa governorates, amounting to crimes against humanity", said the report from 27 August 2014. ISIS also persecuted gay and bisexual men.

Enforced disappearances and arbitrary detentions have also been a feature since the Syrian uprising began. An Amnesty International report, published in November 2015, stated the Syrian government has forcibly disappeared more than 65,000 people since the beginning of the Syrian civil war. According to a report in May 2016 by the Syrian Observatory for Human Rights, at least 60,000 people have been killed since March 2011 through torture or from poor humanitarian conditions in Syrian government prisons.

In February 2017, Amnesty International published a report which stated the Syrian government murdered an estimated 13,000 persons, mostly civilians, at the Saydnaya military prison. They stated the killings began in 2011 and were still ongoing. Amnesty International described this as a "policy of deliberate extermination" and also stated that "These practices, which amount to war crimes and crimes against humanity, are authorised at the highest levels of the Syrian government". Three months later, the United States State Department stated a crematorium had been identified near the prison. According to the U.S., it was being used to burn thousands of bodies of those killed by the government's forces and to cover up evidence of atrocities and war crimes. Amnesty International expressed surprise at the reports about the crematorium, as the photographs used by the US are from 2013 and they did not see them as conclusive, and fugitive government officials have stated that the government buries those its executes in cemeteries on military grounds in Damascus. The Syrian government said the reports were not true.

By July 2012, the human rights group Women Under Siege had documented over 100 cases of rape and sexual assault during the conflict, with many of these crimes reported to have been perpetrated by the Shabiha and other pro-government militias. Victims included men, women, and children, with about 80% of the known victims being women and girls.

On 11 September 2019, the UN investigators said that air strikes conducted by the US-led coalition in Syria have killed or wounded several civilians, denoting that necessary precautions were not taken leading to potential war crimes.

In late 2019, as the violence intensified in north-west Syria, thousands of women and children were reportedly kept under "inhumane conditions" in a remote camp, said UN-appointed investigators. In October 2019, Amnesty International stated that it had gathered evidence of war crimes and other violations committed by Turkish and Turkey-backed Syrian forces who are said to "have displayed a shameful disregard for civilian life, carrying out serious violations and war crimes, including summary killings and unlawful attacks that have killed and injured civilians".

According to a 2020 report by U.N.-backed investigators into the Syrian civil war, young girls aged nine and above have been raped and inveigled into sexual slavery, while boys have been put through torture and forcefully trained to execute killings in public. Children have been attacked by sharpshooters and lured to be bargaining chips for ransoms.

On 6 April 2020, the United Nations published its investigation into the attacks on humanitarian sites in Syria. The council in its reports said, it had examined 6 sites of attacks and concluded that the airstrikes had been carried out by the "Government of Syria and/or its allies." However, the report was criticized for being partial towards Russia and not naming it, despite proper evidence. "The refusal to explicitly name Russia as a responsible party working alongside the Syrian government … is deeply disappointing," the HRW quoted.

On 27 April 2020, the Syrian Network for Human Rights reported continuation of multiple crimes in the month of March and April in Syria. The rights organization billed that Syrian regime decimated 44 civilians, including six children, during the unprecedented times of COVID-19. It also said, Syrian forces held captive 156 people, while committing a minimum of four attacks on vital civilian facilities. The report further recommended that the UN impose sanctions on the Bashar al-Assad regime, if it continues to commit human rights violation.

On 8 May 2020, the UN High Commissioner for Human Rights Michelle Bachelet, raised serious concern that rebel groups, including ISIL terrorist fighters, may be using the COVID-19 pandemic as "an opportunity to re-group and inflict violence in the country".

On 21 July 2020, the Syrian government forces carried out an attack and killed two civilians with four Grad rockets in western al-Bab sub-district.

On 14 January 2022, in the rebel-held city of Azaz in northwest Syria, a car bomb went off killing one and wounding several bystanders. According to a rescue worker, an improvised explosive device had been housed inside a car and then the car was planted near a local transport office in the city which is close to the Turkish border. In the town of al Bab, a suicide bomb went off wounding three and in the city of Afrin, another suicide bomb went off at a roundabout. All these three bombings happened in a span of hours and minutes from each other.

According to Aljazeera, a rocket attack on a northern Syrian town controlled by Turkey-backed opposition fighters killed six civilians and injured more than a dozen others on 21 January 2022. According to the British-based Syrian Observatory for Human Rights, it was unclear who fired the artillery shells, but the attack came from a region populated by Kurdish fighters and Syrian government forces.

After an attack on a Syrian jail on 23 January 2022, over 120 individuals were killed in an ongoing conflict between Kurdish-led troops and ISIL (ISIS) fighters. According to the UK-based Syrian Observatory for Human Rights, "at least 77 IS members and 39 Kurdish fighters, including internal security forces, prison guards and counter-terrorism forces were killed" in the attack.

Crime wave 

As the conflict has expanded across Syria, many cities have been engulfed in a wave of crime as fighting caused the disintegration of much of the civilian state, and many police stations stopped functioning. Rates of theft increased, with criminals looting houses and stores. Rates of kidnappings increased as well. Rebel fighters were seen stealing cars and, in one instance, destroying a restaurant in Aleppo where Syrian soldiers had been seen eating.

Local National Defense Forces commanders often engaged "in war profiteering through protection rackets, looting, and organized crime". NDF members were also implicated in "waves of murders, robberies, thefts, kidnappings, and extortions throughout government-held parts of Syria since the formation of the organization in 2013", as reported by the Institute for the Study of War.

Criminal networks have been used by both the government and the opposition during the conflict. Facing international sanctions, the Syrian government relied on criminal organizations to smuggle goods and money in and out of the country. The economic downturn caused by the conflict and sanctions also led to lower wages for Shabiha members. In response, some Shabiha members began stealing civilian properties and engaging in kidnappings. Rebel forces sometimes rely on criminal networks to obtain weapons and supplies. Black market weapon prices in Syria's neighboring countries have significantly increased since the start of the conflict. To generate funds to purchase arms, some rebel groups have turned towards extortion, theft, and kidnapping.

Syria has become the chief location for manufacturing of Captagon, an illegal amphetamine. Drugs manufactured in Syria have found their way across the Gulf, Jordan and Europe but have at times been intercepted. In January 2022, a Jordanian army officer was shot and killed and three army personnel injured after a shoot out erupted between drug smugglers and the army. The Jordanian army has said that it shot down a drone in 2021 that was being used to smuggle a substantial amount of drugs across the Jordanian border.

Epidemics 

The World Health Organization has reported that 35% of the country's hospitals are out of service. Fighting makes it impossible to undertake the normal vaccination programs. The displaced refugees may also pose a disease risk to countries to which they have fled. 400,000 civilians were isolated by the Siege of Eastern Ghouta from April 2013 to April 2018, resulting in acutely malnourished children according to the United Nations Special Advisor, Jan Egeland, who urged the parties for medical evacuations. 55,000 civilians are also isolated in the Rukban refugee camp between Syria and Jordan, where humanitarian relief access is difficult due to the harsh desert conditions. Humanitarian aid reaches the camp only sporadically, sometimes taking three months between shipments.

Formerly rare infectious diseases have spread in rebel-held areas brought on by poor sanitation and deteriorating living conditions. The diseases have primarily affected children. These include measles, typhoid, hepatitis, dysentery, tuberculosis, diphtheria, whooping cough and the disfiguring skin disease leishmaniasis. Of particular concern is the contagious and crippling Poliomyelitis. As of late 2013 doctors and international public health agencies have reported more than 90 cases. Critics of the government complain that, even before the uprising, it contributed to the spread of disease by purposefully restricting access to vaccination, sanitation and access to hygienic water in "areas considered politically unsympathetic".

In June 2020, the United Nations reported that after more than nine years of war, Syria was falling into an even deeper crisis and economic deterioration as a result of the COVID-19 pandemic. As of 26 June, a total of 248 people were infected by COVID-19, out of which nine people died. Restrictions on the importation of medical supplies, limited access to essential equipment, reduced outside support and ongoing attacks on medical facilities left Syria's health infrastructure in peril, and unable to meet the needs of its population. Syrian communities were additionally facing unprecedented levels of hunger crisis.

In September 2022, the UN representative in Syria reported that several regions in the country were witnessing a cholera outbreak. UN Resident and Humanitarian Coordinator Imran Riza called for an urgent response to contain the outbreak, saying that it posed "a serious threat to people in Syria". The outbreak was linked to the use of contaminated water for growing crops and the reliance of people on unsafe water sources.

Humanitarian aid 

The conflict holds the record for the largest sum ever requested by UN agencies for a single humanitarian emergency, $6.5 billion worth of requests of December 2013. The international humanitarian response to the conflict in Syria is coordinated by the United Nations Office for the Coordination of Humanitarian Affairs (UNOCHA) in accordance with General Assembly Resolution 46/182. The primary framework for this coordination is the Syria Humanitarian Assistance Response Plan (SHARP) which appealed for US$1.41 billion to meet the humanitarian needs of Syrians affected by the conflict. Official United Nations data on the humanitarian situation and response is available at an official website managed by UNOCHA Syria (Amman). UNICEF is also working alongside these organizations to provide vaccinations and care packages to those in need. Financial information on the response to the SHARP and assistance to refugees and for cross-border operations can be found on UNOCHA's Financial Tracking Service. As of 19 September 2015, the top ten donors to Syria were United States, European Commission, United Kingdom, Kuwait, Germany, Saudi Arabia, Canada, Japan, UAE, and Norway.

The difficulty of delivering humanitarian aid to people is indicated by the statistics for January 2015: of the estimated 212,000 people during that month who were besieged by government or opposition forces, 304 were reached with food. USAID and other government agencies in US delivered nearly $385 million of aid items to Syria in 2012 and 2013. The United States has provided food aid, medical supplies, emergency and basic health care, shelter materials, clean water, hygiene education and supplies, and other relief supplies. Islamic Relief has stocked 30 hospitals and sent hundreds of thousands of medical and food parcels.

Other countries in the region have also contributed various levels of aid. Iran has been exporting between 500 and 800 tonnes of flour daily to Syria. Israel supplied aid through Operation Good Neighbor, providing medical treatment to 750 Syrians in a field hospital located in Golan Heights where rebels say that 250 of their fighters were treated. Israel established two medical centers inside Syria. Israel also delivered heating fuel, diesel fuel, seven electric generators, water pipes, educational materials, flour for bakeries, baby food, diapers, shoes and clothing. Syrian refugees in Lebanon make up one quarter of Lebanon's population, mostly consisting of women and children. In addition, Russia has said it created six humanitarian aid centers within Syria to support 3000 refugees in 2016.

On 9 April 2020, the UN dispatched 51 truckloads of humanitarian aid to Idlib. The organization said that the aid would be distributed among civilians stranded in the north-western part of the country.

On 30 April 2020, Human Rights Watch condemned the Syrian authorities for their longstanding restriction on the entry of aid supplies. It also demanded the World Health Organization to keep pushing the UN to allow medical aid and other essentials to reach Syria via the Iraq border crossing, to prevent the spread of COVID-19 in the war-torn nation. The aid supplies, if allowed, will allow the Syrian population to protect themselves from contracting the COVID-19 virus.

2019 UN cross-border aid dispute 
As of December 2019, a diplomatic dispute is occurring at the UN over re-authorization of cross-border aid for refugees. China and Russia oppose the draft resolution that seeks to re-authorize crossing points in Turkey, Iraq, and Jordan; China and Russia, as allies of Assad, seek to close the two crossing points in Iraq and Jordan, and to leave only the two crossing points in Turkey active. The current authorization expired on 10 January 2020.

All of the ten individuals representing the non-permanent members of the Security Council stood in the corridor outside of the chamber speaking to the press to state that all four crossing points are crucial and must be renewed.

United Nations official Mark Lowcock is asking the UN to re-authorize cross-border aid to enable aid to continue to reach refugees in Syria. He says there is no other way to deliver the aid that is needed. He noted that four million refugees out of the over eleven million refugees who need assistance are being reached through four specific international crossing points. Lowcock serves as the United Nations Under-Secretary-General for Humanitarian Affairs and Emergency Relief Coordinator and the Head of the United Nations Office for the Coordination of Humanitarian Affairs.

Russia, aided by China's support, has vetoed the resolution to retain all four border crossings. An alternate resolution also did not pass. The US strongly criticized the vetoes and opposition by Russia and China. China explained the reason for veto is the concern of "unilateral coercive measures" by certain states causing humanitarian suffering on the Syrian people. It views lifting all unilateral sanctions respecting Syrian sovereignty and for humanitarian reasons is a must.

Cultural impact 

, the war has affected 290 heritage sites, severely damaged 104, and completely destroyed 24. Five of the six UNESCO World Heritage Sites in Syria have been damaged. Destruction of antiquities has been caused by shelling, army entrenchment, and looting at various tells, museums, and monuments. A group called Syrian Archaeological Heritage Under Threat is monitoring and recording the destruction in an attempt to create a list of heritage sites damaged during the war and to gain global support for the protection and preservation of Syrian archaeology and architecture.

UNESCO listed all six Syria's World Heritage Sites as endangered but direct assessment of damage is not possible. It is known that the Old City of Aleppo was heavily damaged during battles being fought within the district, while Palmyra and Krak des Chevaliers suffered minor damage. Illegal digging is said to be a grave danger, and hundreds of Syrian antiquities, including some from Palmyra, appeared in Lebanon. Three archeological museums are known to have been looted; in Raqqa some artifacts seem to have been destroyed by foreign Islamists due to religious objections.

In 2014 and 2015, following the rise of the Islamic State of Iraq and the Levant, several sites in Syria were destroyed by the group as part of a deliberate destruction of cultural heritage sites. In Palmyra, the group destroyed many ancient statues, the Temples of Baalshamin and Bel, many tombs including the Tower of Elahbel, and part of the Monumental Arch. The 13th-century Palmyra Castle was extensively damaged by retreating militants during the Palmyra offensive in March 2016. ISIL also destroyed ancient statues in Raqqa, and a number of churches, including the Armenian Genocide Memorial Church in Deir ez-Zor.

In January 2018 Turkish airstrikes have seriously damaged an ancient Neo-Hittite temple in Syria's Kurdish-held Afrin region. It was built by the Arameans in the first millennium BC.

According to a September 2019 Syrian Network for Human Rights reports more than 120 Christian churches have been destroyed or damaged in Syria since 2011.

The war has inspired its own particular artwork, done by Syrians. A late summer 2013 exhibition in London at the P21 Gallery showed some of this work, which had to be smuggled out of Syria.

Media coverage 

The Syrian civil war is one of the most heavily documented wars in history, despite the extreme dangers that journalists face while in Syria.

ISIL and al-Qaeda executions 
On 19 August 2014, American journalist James Foley was executed by ISIL, who said it was in retaliation for the United States operations in Iraq. Foley was kidnapped in Syria in November 2012 by Shabiha militia. ISIL also threatened to execute Steven Sotloff, who was kidnapped at the Syrian-Turkish border in August 2013. There were reports ISIS captured a Japanese national, two Italian nationals, and a Danish national as well. Sotloff was later executed in September 2014. At least 70 journalists have been killed covering the Syrian war, and more than 80 kidnapped, according to the Committee to Protect Journalists. On 22 August 2014, the al-Nusra Front released a video of captured Lebanese soldiers and demanded Hezbollah withdraw from Syria under threat of their execution.

International reactions and diplomacy 

During the early period of the civil war, The Arab League, European Union, the United Nations, and many Western governments quickly condemned the Syrian government's violent response to the protests, and expressed support for the protesters' right to exercise free speech. Initially, many Middle Eastern governments expressed support for Assad, but as the death toll mounted, they switched to a more balanced approach by criticizing violence from both government and protesters. Both the Arab League and the Organisation of Islamic Cooperation suspended Syria's membership. Russia and China vetoed Western-drafted United Nations Security Council resolutions in 2011 and 2012, which would have threatened the Syrian government with targeted sanctions if it continued military actions against protestors.

Economic sanctions 

The US Congress has enacted punitive sanctions on the Syrian government for its actions during the Civil War. These sanctions would penalize any entities lending support to the Syrian government, and any companies operating in Syria. US President Donald Trump tried to protect the Turkish President Erdogan from the effects of such sanctions.

Some activists welcomed this legislation. Some critics contend that these punitive sanctions are likely to backfire or have unintended consequences; they argue that ordinary Syrian people will have fewer economic resources due to these sanctions (and will thus need to rely more the Syrian government and its economic allies and projects), while the sanctions' impact on ruling political elites will be limited.

Mohammad al-Abdallah, executive director of Syria Justice and Accountability Center (SJAC), said that the sanctions will likely hurt ordinary Syrian people, saying, "it is an almost unsolvable unfeasible equation. If they are imposed, they will indirectly harm the Syrian people, and if they are lifted, they will indirectly revive the Syrian regime;" he attributed the sanctions to "political considerations, as the United States does not have weapons and tools in the Syrian file, and sanctions are its only means."

Peter Ford, the former UK Ambassador to Syria, said "...going forward, we're seeing more economic warfare. It seems that the US, having failed to change the regime in Syria by military force or by proxies, is tightening the economic screws and the main reason why the US is keeping hold of the production facilities in eastern Syria. So, the economic situation is becoming more and more serious and dire in Syria and it's a major reason why refugees are not going back."

In June, US Secretary of State Mike Pompeo announced new economic sanctions on Syria targeting foreign business relations with the Syrian government. Under the Caesar Act, the latest sanctions were to be imposed on 39 individuals and entities, including Asma al-Assad, wife of Syrian President Bashar al-Assad.

On 17 June 2020, James F. Jeffrey, Special Representative for Syria Engagement, signalled that the UAE could be hit with sanctions under the Caesar Act if it pushed ahead with normalisation efforts with the Syrian regime.

2019 negotiations

During the course of the war, there have been several international peace initiatives, undertaken by the Arab League, the United Nations, and other actors. The Syrian government has refused efforts to negotiate with what it describes as armed terrorist groups. On 1 February 2016, the UN announced the formal start of the UN-mediated Geneva Syria peace talks that had been agreed on by the International Syria Support Group (ISSG) in Vienna. On 3 February 2016, the UN Syria peace mediator suspended the talks. On 14 March 2016, Geneva peace talks resumed. The Syrian government stated that discussion of Bashar-al-Assad's presidency "is a red line", however Syria's President Bashar al-Assad said he hoped peace talks in Geneva would lead to concrete results, and stressed the need for a political process in Syria.

A new round of talks between the Syrian government and some groups of Syrian rebels concluded on 24 January 2017 in Astana, Kazakhstan, with Russia, Iran and Turkey supporting the ceasefire agreement brokered in late December 2016. The Astana Process talks was billed by a Russian official as a complement to, rather than replacement, of the United Nations-led Geneva Process talks. On 4 May 2017, at the fourth round of the Astana talks, representatives of Russia, Iran, and Turkey signed a memorandum whereby four "de-escalation zones" in Syria would be established, effective of 6 May 2017.

On 18 September 2019, Russia stated the United States and Syrian rebels were obstructing the evacuation process of a refugee camp in southern Syria.

On 28 September 2019, Syria's top diplomat demanded the foreign forces, including that of US and Turkey, to immediately leave the country, saying that the Syrian government holds the right to protect its territory in all possible ways if they remain.

President RT Erdogan said Turkey was left with no choice other than going its own way on the Syria 'safe zone' after a deadline to co-jointly establish a "safe zone" with the US in northern Syria expired in September. The U.S. indicated it would withdraw its forces from northern Syria after Turkey warned of incursion in the region that could instigate fighting with American-backed Kurds.

Buffer zone with Turkey 

In October 2019, in response to the Turkish offensive, Russia arranged for negotiations between the Syrian government in Damascus and the Kurdish-led forces. Russia also negotiated a renewal of a cease-fire between Kurds and Turkey that was about to expire.

Russia and Turkey agreed via the Sochi Agreement of 2019 to set up a Second Northern Syria Buffer Zone. Syrian President Assad expressed full support for the deal, as various terms of the agreement also applied to the Syrian government. The SDF stated that they considered themselves as "Syrian and a part of Syria", adding that they would agree to work with the Syrian Government. The SDF officially announced their support for the deal on 27 October.

The agreement reportedly included the following terms:

 A buffer zone would be established in Northern Syria.
 The buffer zone would be controlled jointly by the Syrian Army and Russian Military Police.
 All YPG forces, which constitute the majority of the SDF, must withdraw from the buffer zone entirely, along with their weapons, within 150 hours from the announcement of the deal. Their withdrawal would be overseen by Russian Military Police and the Syrian Border Guards, which would then enter the zone.

Syrian Constitutional Committee 

In late 2019, a new Syrian Constitutional Committee began operating in order to discuss a new settlement and to draft a new constitution for Syria. This committee comprises about 150 members. It includes representatives of the Syrian government, opposition groups, and countries serving as guarantors of the process, such as Russia. However, this committee has faced strong opposition from the Assad government. 50 of the committee members represent the government, and 50 members represent the opposition. Until the Assad government agrees to participate, is unclear whether the third round of talks will proceed on a firm schedule.

In December 2019, the EU held an international conference which condemned any suppression of the Kurds, and called for the self-declared Autonomous Administration in Rojava to be preserved and to be reflected in any new Syrian Constitution. The Kurds are concerned that the independence of their declared Autonomous Administration of North and East Syria (AANES) in Rojava might be severely curtailed.

Rojava officials condemned the fact that they were excluded from the peace talks and stated that "having a couple of Kurds" in the committee did not mean that the Syrian Kurds were properly represented in it. The co-chair of the Syrian Democratic Council accused Turkey of vetoing the representation of Syrian Kurds within the committee. The Kurdish administration also organized demonstrations in front of the UN office in Qamishli to protest their exclusion from the committee.

Reconstruction 

United Nations authorities have estimated that the war in Syria has caused destruction reaching to about $400 billion.  SNHR reported in 2017 that the war has rendered around 39% of Syrian mosques unserviceable for worship. More than 13,500 mosques were destroyed in Syria between 2011-2017. Around 1,400 were dismantled by 2013, while 13,000 mosques got demolished between 2013-2017. According to a Syrian war monitor, over 120 churches have been damaged or demolished by during the course of Syrian war since 2011; and 60% of these attacks were perpetrated by pro-Assad forces.

While the war is still ongoing, Syrian President Bashar Al-Assad said that Syria would be able to rebuild the war-torn country on its own. , the reconstruction is estimated to cost a minimum of US$400 billion. Assad said he would be able to loan this money from friendly countries, Syrian diaspora and the state treasury. Iran has expressed interest in helping rebuild Syria. One year later this seemed to be materializing, Iran and the Syrian government signed a deal where Iran would help rebuild the Syrian energy grid, which has taken damage to 50% of the grid. International donors have been suggested as one financier of the reconstruction. , reports emerged that rebuilding efforts had already started. It was reported that the biggest issue facing the rebuilding process is the lack of building material and a need to make sure the resources that do exist are managed efficiently. The rebuilding effort have so far remained at a limited capacity and has often been focused on certain areas of a city, thus ignoring other areas inhabited by disadvantaged people.

Various efforts are proceeding to rebuild infrastructure in Syria. Russia says it will spend $500 million to modernize Syria's port of Tartus. Russia also said it will build a railway to link Syria with the Persian Gulf. Russia will also contribute to recovery efforts by the UN. Syria awarded oil exploration contracts to two Russian firms.

Syria announced it is in serious dialogue with China to join China's "Belt and Road Initiative" designed to foster investment in infrastructure in over one-hundred developing nations worldwide. On Wednesday 12 January 2022, China and Syria signed a memorandum of understanding in Damascus. The memorandum was signed by Fadi al-Khalil, the Head of Planning and International Cooperation Commission for the Syrian Side and Feng Biao, the Chinese ambassador in Damascus for the Chinese side. The memorandum sees Syria join the initiative whose aim is to help expand cooperation with China and other partner countries in areas such as trade, technology, capital, human movement and cultural exchange. Among other things, it aims to define the future of this cooperation with partner states.

See also 

 Belligerents in the Syrian civil war

Events within Syrian society 
 2010s in Syria political history
 Cities and towns during the Syrian civil war
 Eastern Syria insurgency
 Inter-rebel conflict during the Syrian civil war
 Rojava conflict
 Timeline of the Syrian civil war

Historical aspects 
 Spillover of the Syrian civil war
 Syria chemical weapons program
 Syrian–Turkish border clashes during the Syrian civil war
 Terrorism in Syria
 Syrian civil war in popular culture

Lists and statistical records 
 Casualty recording
 Human rights violations during the Syrian civil war
 List of Syrian defectors
 List of aviation shootdowns and accidents during the Syrian civil war
 List of terrorist incidents in Syria

Specific offensives 
 Northwestern Syria offensive (April–June 2015) ("Battle of Victory")

Peace efforts and civil society groups 
 Syrian civil war ceasefires
 Syrian Democratic Council
 Syrian diaspora
 Syrian peace process
 White Helmets (Syrian civil war)

History of other local conflicts 
 Iraqi insurgency (2011–2013)
 War in Iraq (2013–2017)
 List of wars involving Syria

Notes

References

Further reading 
 
 

 
 
 
 Cordesman, Anthony "Failed State Wars" in Syria and Iraq (III): Stability and Conflict in Syria  Center for Strategic and International Studies. 2 March 2016. Retrieved 20 March 2016.

External links

 
2011 in Syria
2010s in Syria
2020s in Syria
2010s civil wars
2020s civil wars
Civil wars post-1945
Arab Winter in Syria
Politics of Syria
Protests in Syria
Rebellions in Syria
Military operations of the Syrian civil war
Geopolitical rivalry
Proxy wars
Religion-based civil wars
Religion-based wars
Civil wars involving the states and peoples of Asia
Human shield incidents
Iran–Saudi Arabia proxy conflict
Iran–Israel proxy conflict
Wars involving Syria
Wars involving Egypt
Wars involving France
Wars involving Hezbollah
Wars involving Iran
Wars involving Iraq
Wars involving Israel
Wars involving Jordan
Wars involving Qatar
Wars involving Russia
Wars involving Saudi Arabia
Wars involving the United Kingdom
Wars involving the United States
Wars involving Turkey
Wars involving the Islamic State of Iraq and the Levant
Wars involving the Popular Mobilization Forces